Khud-e Pain (also Romanized as Khūd-e Pā’īn; also known as Khod-e-Pā’īn, Khūd-e Soflá, and Khūde Soflá) is a village in Nasrabad Rural District, in the Central District of Taft County, Yazd Province, Iran. At the 2006 census, its population was 74, in 26 families.

References 

Populated places in Taft County